The Wankel AG LCR - 814 TGti is a German Wankel aircraft engine, designed and produced by Wankel AG of Kirchberg, Saxony for use in ultralight aircraft.

Design and development
The LCR - 814 TGti engine is a twin-rotor four-stroke,  displacement, liquid-cooled, fuel injected, gasoline, Wankel engine design, with a toothed poly V belt reduction drive with a reduction ratio of 3:1. It employs dual electronic ignition and produces  at 6000 rpm.

Specifications (LCR - 814 TGti)

See also

References

External links

Wankel AG aircraft engines
Pistonless rotary engine